"Crossing Brooklyn Ferry" is a poem by Walt Whitman, and is part of his collection Leaves of Grass. It describes the ferry trip across the East River from Manhattan to Brooklyn at the exact location that was to become the Brooklyn Bridge.

The speaker begins half an hour before sunset, and continues into the evening with a description comparing the tides to the attraction of New York City. Cataloguing and an appeal of the body and soul feature prominently in the poem, relating to Whitman's experiences in growing up in Brooklyn from 1823 to 1833 and then 1845 to 1863.

The poem specifically addresses future readers who will look back on it, and the ferry ride, years hence. In the first stanza, Whitman writes:
And you that shall cross from shore to shore years hence are more to me, and more in my meditations, than you might suppose.

A portion of the poem is used as an inscription at the Fulton Ferry Landing in Brooklyn Heights, where the ferry landed.  A Brooklyn ice cream maker, Ample Hills, takes its name from a line in the poem.

References

External links
 Crossing Brooklyn Ferry at Immortal Poetry

Poetry by Walt Whitman
1855 poems